Marcelo dos Santos Cipriano (born 11 October 1969), known simply as Marcelo, is a Portuguese former footballer who played as a striker.

He played professionally in Portugal (most notably one season for Benfica), England, where he appeared for three First Division (second-tier) clubs, and Spain.

Club career

Académica / Benfica
Born in Niterói, Rio de Janeiro to Portuguese parents, Marcelo returned to their homeland still in his teens, entering the youth system of Associação Académica de Coimbra, which loaned him to fourth division team Sertanense F.C. in the summer of 1989.

After one season apiece with Académica and C.D. Feirense in the second level, Marcelo made his Primeira Liga debut with Gil Vicente FC, scoring three goals for the Barcelos-based club. His most successful period in his adopted nation would be lived at lowly F.C. Tirsense, which he helped achieve top flight promotion in 1994, subsequently netting 17 times in 1994–95 as the northerners achieved a best-ever eight-place in the competition.

Marcelo's exploits earned him a transfer to S.L. Benfica, finishing his sole season as team topscorer in the league behind João Vieira Pinto, but his side did not win any silverware. He then spent one year in the Spanish second tier with Deportivo Alavés, going scoreless in nearly 25 league appearances.

England / Later years
In the following five years, Marcelo played in England, starting in 1997 with Sheffield United, which signed the player for a fee of £400,000. In the FA Cup tournament during his first year, he helped take the team to the semi-finals, after scoring against Coventry City at Highfield Road to set up the (eventually victorious) replay.

Birmingham City acquired Marcelo's services in 1999 for a fee of £500,000. He played on the losing side in the 2001 Football League Cup Final, coming on as a second-half substitute and netting in the penalty shootout; he ended his career in the country at Walsall, for whom he played nine times and scored once, against Burnley.

At nearly 33, Marcelo returned to Portugal and first professional club Académica, spending a further two seasons in the top division after which he retired from the game.

Honours
Benfica
Taça de Portugal: 1995–96

Tirsense
Segunda Liga: 1993–94

Birmingham City
Football League Cup runner-up: 2000–01

References

External links
 
 
 

1969 births
Living people
Sportspeople from Niterói
Brazilian people of Portuguese descent
Portuguese footballers
Association football forwards
Primeira Liga players
Liga Portugal 2 players
Segunda Divisão players
Associação Académica de Coimbra – O.A.F. players
Sertanense F.C. players
C.D. Feirense players
Gil Vicente F.C. players
F.C. Tirsense players
S.L. Benfica footballers
Segunda División players
Deportivo Alavés players
English Football League players
Sheffield United F.C. players
Birmingham City F.C. players
Walsall F.C. players
Portuguese expatriate footballers
Expatriate footballers in Spain
Expatriate footballers in England
Brazilian expatriates in Portugal
Portuguese expatriate sportspeople in Spain
Portuguese expatriate sportspeople in England